Fayez Sarofim (‎; 1929 – 27 May 2022) was an Egyptian Coptic-American heir to the Sarofim family fortune, fund manager for a number of Dreyfus family stock funds, largest shareholder of Kinder Morgan (NYSE: KMI) and part owner of the NFL team Houston Texans.

Sarofim had an estimated net worth of $1.6 billion in May 2022. His investment firm oversaw over $30 billion in assets.

Early life 
Fayez Shalaby Sarofim was born in 1929 in Cairo. His family belonged to the old nobility of Egypt. As the son of an Egyptian aristocrat and agricultural magnate, Sarofim spent his early life as a member of Egypt's political and wealthy elite in modern Heliopolis. Holding the title of a Bey (or Chieftain), Sarofim's father also held large, feudal cotton estates throughout North Africa. Upon his death, Sarofim inherited a portion of his fortune.

Sarofim came to the United States in 1946 and became a naturalized American citizen in 1961.

After earning degrees from the University of California, Berkeley and Harvard Business School, Sarofim took a job with cotton company Anderson, Clayton and Company in Houston.

Career
In August 1958, he founded Fayez Sarofim & Company, a Houston investment firm. In 1997, he was inducted into the Texas Business Hall of Fame.  Sarofim is ranked third on the most influential Egyptian Americans. The Sarofim family is recorded in Burke's Peerage and the 'Imperial and Asiatic quarterly review and oriental and colonial record'.

Philanthropy and political donations
Sarofim was a contributor to the Houston Ballet and the Museum of Fine Arts, Houston, a favorite of his daughter Allison. He provided support to Memorial Sloan–Kettering Cancer Center, the Texas Children’s Hospital and the University of Texas Health Science Center at Houston for construction of the $120 million Fayez S. Sarofim Research Building. Sarofim also made financial gifts to the Houston Grand Opera, the Houston Symphony, the Hobby Center for the Performing Arts, creating the 2600 seat, Sarofim Hall, designed for touring Broadway shows, the Alley Theatre, and the Los Angeles Opera.

Sarofim was a major supporter of Jeb Bush's 2016 presidential candidacy.

Personal life
Sarofim was married three times. In 1962, he married Louisa Stude, adopted daughter of Herman Brown, founder of Brown and Root; they had two children: Christopher Sarofim and Allison Sarofim.

In 1984, he had a son, Andrew Sarofim, with Linda Hicks, a former employee at his company. In 1986, they had another son, Phillip, and in 1989, another son Maxwell was born. In 1990, he divorced his first wife who received a $250 million divorce settlement. In 1990, he married Hicks; in 1996, they divorced with Hicks receiving a $12 million settlement. Hicks later died while climbing Mount Kilimanjaro. Maxwell died in 2015.

In December 2014, Sarofim married Susan Krohn, the ex-wife of fellow billionaire Tracy Krohn, and mother of his son Phillip's ex-wife Lori Krohn.

He died on 27 May 2022.

References

1929 births
2022 deaths
American billionaires
American money managers
American people of Coptic descent
Egyptian businesspeople
Egyptian emigrants to the United States
University of California, Berkeley alumni
Stock and commodity market managers
Egyptian billionaires
Coptic Orthodox Christians from Egypt
Harvard Business School alumni